"Krzy Train" is a song by American rapper's Trippie Redd and Travis Scott. It was released on January 20, 2023 as a track from Trippie Redd's fourth studio album Mansion Musik  (2023).

Background
On January 9, 2023, Redd would revealed that Travis Scott would be featured on a song from his upcoming album by posting a picture of a conversation with him that saw the two discussing details about their collaboration for the album.

Credits and personnel
 Trippie Redd – vocals, songwriting
 Travis Scott – vocals, songwriting
 Bosley – production, songwriting
 dreamr. – production, songwriting
 Bacon and Popcorn – production, songwriting
 HnrzHunter – production, songwriting
 Igor Mamet – mastering, mixing, recording, production

Charts

References

External links
 

2023 songs
Trippie Redd songs
Travis Scott songs
Songs written by Trippie Redd
Songs written by Travis Scott